The Schit (in its upper course also: Slatina) is a right tributary of the river Bistrița in Romania. It discharges into Lake Izvorul Muntelui near the village Ceahlău.

References

Rivers of Romania
Rivers of Neamț County